Ravneet Singh Bittu is an Indian politician. He previously served as the leader of Indian National Congress in Lok Sabha from 11 March 2021 to 18 July 2021. Bittu was elected to the Lok Sabha, lower house of the Parliament of India from Ludhiana and earlier from Anandpur Sahib. He won the 2009, 2014 and 2019 Indian general election being an Indian National Congress candidate. He is the grandson of former Punjab Chief Minister Beant Singh. 

In January 2021, he was assaulted at the Singhu border during a 'Jan Sansad' program.

He was appointed the party whip in Lok Sabha.

In March 2021, he was briefly appointed the leader of the opposition in the Lok Sabha when the existing LOP Adhir Ranjan Chowdhury was busy in West Bengal election campaigns.

Election results

Committee memberships 

 Committee on Public Undertakings (COPU) - Member 2018

References

|-

|-

|-

External links
Official biographical sketch in Parliament of India website

India MPs 2014–2019
Lok Sabha members from Punjab, India
People from Ludhiana district
Living people
Indian National Congress politicians from Punjab, India
1975 births
India MPs 2009–2014
Politicians from Ludhiana
India MPs 2019–present